HMDB may refer to
Historical Marker Database
Human Metabolome Database